Li Lecheng (born 27 March 1965) is a Chinese politician who is the current governor of Liaoning, in office since 20 October 2021. previously he served as executive vice governor of Hubei.

Biography
Li was born in Jianli County, Hubei, on 27 March 1965. In 1980, he entered Huazhong Institute of Technology (now Huazhong University of Science and Technology), majoring in mechanical manufacturing process equipment and automation, where he graduated in 1984.

Li served in several posts at Shayang Machinery Factory in Jingmen since August 1984, including technician, director of Technology Section, director of Technology Development Office, deputy factory director, and factory director. He joined the Communist Party of China (CPC) in December 1991. He served as deputy general manager of Jingmen Machinery Metallurgical Industry Corporation in December 1996, and soon promoted to the general manager position in February 1998. In November 2000, he became vice chairman of Hubei Dongguang Group Co., Ltd., rising to chairman the next year. 

Li got involved in politics in January 2002, when he was admitted to member of the standing committee of the CPC Jingmen Municipal Committee, the city's top authority. He was appointed president of Jingmen Trade Union Federation in February 2002, concurrently serving as head of Organization Department since September 2003. In January 2007, he was elevated to vice mayor. In February 2008, he was promoted to acting mayor of Yichang, confirmed in March of that same year. In March 2013, he was appointed director of Hubei Provincial Development and Reform Commission, he remained in that position until February 2017, when he was transferred to Xiangyang and appointed party secretary, the top political position in the city. In June 2017, he was promoted to member of the standing committee of the CPC Hubei Provincial Committee, the province's top authority. He rose to become executive vice governor of Hubei in January 2021.

On 20 October 2021, he was promoted again to become acting governor of Liaoning, replacing Liu Ning, who was transferred to Guangxi and appointed party secretary.

References

1965 births
Living people
People from Jianli
Huazhong University of Science and Technology alumni
People's Republic of China politicians from Hubei
Chinese Communist Party politicians from Hubei